Harris Yulin (born November 5, 1937) is an American actor who has appeared in over a hundred film and television series roles, such as Scarface (1983), Ghostbusters II (1989), Clear and Present Danger (1994), Looking for Richard (1996), The Hurricane (1999), Training Day (2001), and Frasier which earned him a Primetime Emmy Award nomination in 1996.

Early life
Yulin was born on November 5, 1937, in Los Angeles, California. He  was raised in a Jewish home.

Career
Yulin made his New York debut in 1963 in Next Time I'll Sing to You by James Saunders and continued to work frequently in theater throughout his career.

His Broadway debut came in the 1980s Watch on the Rhine. He returned to Broadway multiple times in productions of The Visit, The Diary of Anne Frank, The Price, and Hedda Gabler. In 2010, he played Willy Loman in Death of A Salesman at the Gate Theatre in Dublin, Ireland.

His first film role was his portrayal of Wyatt Earp in Doc (1971) starring Stacy Keach as Doc Holliday. He appeared in the Brian De Palma film Scarface (1983) as corrupt cop Mel Bernstein. In 1989, he played the role of Judge Stephen Wexler in Ghostbusters II. He portrayed a corrupt national security adviser in the 1994 Harrison Ford thriller Clear and Present Danger. In 1997, he played the role of George Grierson in Bean.  In 2001, he portrayed Secret Service Agent Sterling in Rush Hour 2.

On television, Yulin appeared in Star Trek: Deep Space Nine in the episode "Duet". During the second season of the TV series 24, he played the Director of the National Security Agency, Roger Stanton. He was nominated for a 1996 Emmy for his portrayal of crime boss Jerome Belasco in the sitcom Frasier. In the series Buffy the Vampire Slayer, he played Quentin Travers, head of the Watchers' Council. Yulin also appeared in Season 3 of Entourage in the episode "Return of the King" as studio head Arthur Gadoff. In 2009, he performed in The People Speak, a documentary feature film that uses dramatic and musical performances of the letters, diaries, and speeches of everyday Americans, based on historian Howard Zinn's A People's History of the United States. In 2010 he appeared in the AMC series Rubicon. In 2017 to 2018 he played in 12 episodes of Ozark.

Yulin won the Lucille Lortel Award for directing The Trip to Bountiful at the Signature Theatre in New York with Lois Smith.

Film critic Jim Emerson once quipped that Yulin "should be in every movie ever made".

Personal life
Yulin dated Faye Dunaway from 1971 to 1972.  He was married to actress Gwen Welles until her death in 1993. His second marriage was to Kristen Lowman.

Filmography

Film

Television

FBI Most Wanted 
Season 4 Episode 7
"KARMA"

References

External links

1937 births
Living people
20th-century American male actors
21st-century American male actors
American male film actors
American male television actors
Jewish American male actors
Male actors from Los Angeles
21st-century American Jews